Organized crime in Pakistan  refers to the activities of groups of organized crime in Pakistan, The Pakistani mafia is spread in many countries. Pakistani mafia groups are mostly ethnically-based. The Pakistani mafia is involved in drug trafficking, assassination, land grabbing, arms smuggling and various other illegal activities.

US Congressional report claims that the world's third most wanted fugitive and Indian underworld mobster, Dawood Ibrahim's "D-company has a 'strategic alliance' with Pakistan's ISI". Ever since he took to hiding, his location has been frequently traced to Karachi, Pakistan, a claim which Pakistani authorities have denied.

Other known gangsters from Pakistan are Rehman Dakait of the Peoples' Aman Committee. Pakistan is also home to large drug cartels which export heroin created in Afghanistan. Afghanistan is the largest producer of heroin (see Opium production in Afghanistan), but due to no existing connections to International waters, most of its product is exported through Pakistan to various regions such as Middle east, Europe, and Australia.

Pakistani gangs active in the United Kingdom, as well as several Scandinavian countries to a lesser extent, more closely resemble strictly organized crime groups. Great Britain-based Pakistani organized crime groups are mostly known  for drug trafficking (mainly heroin), arms dealing, as well as other criminal activities.

See also
 Drug addiction in Pakistan

References

 
Crime in Pakistan by type
Street gangs